The 3rd Cavalry Division (3. Kavallerie-Division) was a unit of the Reichswehr, the armed forces of Germany during the Weimar Republic. It consisted of 6 cavalry regiments, the 13th (Prussian), the 14th, 15th, 16th, and the 17th (Bavarian) and the 18th (Saxonian) Cavalry Regiments.

Its commanders were:
Generalleutnant Heinrich von Hofmann (1 June 1920 - 1 October 1920)
Generalleutnant Johannes Koch (1 October 1920 - 16 June 1921)
Generalleutnant Eginhard Eschborn (16 June 1921 - 30 September 1923)
General of the Cavalry Paul Hasse (1 October 1923 - 28 February 1926)
Generalleutnant Hans von Viereck (1 March 1926 - 1 March 1929)
Generalleutnant Curt Freiherr von Gienanth (1 March 1929 - 1 November 1931)
Generalmajor Wilhelm Knochenhauer (1 November 1931 - 1 December 1933)
Generalleutnant Maximilian von Weichs (1 December 1933 - 15 October 1935)

It was subordinated to Gruppenkommando 2.

References

Cavalry divisions of Germany
Military units and formations established in 1920
Military units and formations disestablished in 1933